Hiran Ahmed (born 6 April 2000) is a professional footballer who plays as a midfielder for FC Thun. Born in Germany, he plays for the Iraq national team.

International career
Also eligible to represent Germany, Hiran was invited to the Iraqi Olympic team camp in January 2022, and was one of five Iraqi players based abroad that were later selected for the 2022 Dubai Cup in March. He made his debut against Vietnam and went on to play against Saudi Arabia and Thailand too.

He played in both warm-up matches against Iran before being selected for the 2022 AFC U-23 Asian Cup in Uzbekistan. He assisted Hasan Abdulkareem's goal against Australia and helped Iraq reach the quarter finals before being knocked out of the tournament on penalties by the hosts

On 5 September 2022, Hiran was selected for the first team for the 2022 Jordan International Tournament. On 23 September 2022, he made his first team debut for Iraq in a penalty shootout loss against Oman.

References

External links
 Kicker Profile
 SFP Profile

2000 births
Living people
Sportspeople from Bochum
Iraqi footballers
Iraq international footballers
German footballers
German people of Iraqi descent
Association football midfielders
FC Thun players
Swiss Super League players
Swiss Challenge League players
Iraqi expatriate footballers
German expatriate footballers
Iraqi expatriate sportspeople in Switzerland
German expatriate sportspeople in Switzerland
Expatriate footballers in Switzerland